Phu Chana Sip Thit ( English: Conqueror of the Ten Directions) is a Thai historical novel written by Chote Praepan. The novel depicts the romanticized life of Bayinnaung, a pre-eminent Burmese monarch responsible for establishing the First Toungoo Empire, the largest empire in Southeast Asian history. 

Since its publication in 1932, Phu Chana Sip Thit has been adapted into numerous stage plays, television dramas, radio dramas, and an eponymous song in mainstream Thai culture, which has reinforced the novel's enduring popularity, as well as Bayinnaung's stature within Thai society. 

The novel is an eight volume work, and is one of the longest historical novels in Southeast Asia, and known for its high literary standard and plotline.

Title 
The Thai language title Phu Chana Sip Thit literally means conqueror or victor of the ten directions. The epithet is derived from Slapat Rajawan, a Mon language chronicle, written by a monastery abbot in the 1760s.

Adaptations 

Phu Chana Sip Thit has been adapted into numerous stage plays, radio and television dramas, and films over the years.

Films 
Between 1966 and 1967, the novel was adapted into a film trilogy, directed by Thian Karnasuta (เฑียรร์ กรรณสูต).

Television 
The novel has been adapted as a television drama numerous times, including in 1958, 1961, 1971, 1980, 1983, 1989, and most recently, 2013.

Radio 
The novel has also been adapted as a Thai radio drama on a literary program aired between 1987 and 1997, in 2011, and in 2012.

Music 
Phu Chana Sip Thit was adapted into an eponymous song by Charin Nantanakorn, a popular Thai singer from the 1960s and 1970s.

References 

Thai novels
Thai historical television series
1932 novels
Historical novels